Sidi Othmane is an arrondissement of southeastern Casablanca, in the Moulay Rachid district of the Casablanca-Settat region of Morocco. As of 2004 it had 76,983 inhabitants.

References

Arrondissements of Casablanca